Justin C. Hickman (born July 20, 1985) is a gridiron football scout and former defensive end. He currently serves as an analyst and scouting manager for the Tampa Bay Vipers of the XFL.

He played college football for the University of California, Los Angeles (UCLA), and was a consensus All-American.  He was signed by the Washington Redskins as an undrafted free agent in 2007.  He has also played for the Los Angeles Avengers of the Arena Football League (AFL), the Hamilton Tiger-Cats and Toronto Argonauts of the Canadian Football League (CFL) and the Indianapolis Colts of the National Football League (NFL).

Early years
Hickman was born in El Paso, Texas.  He attended Saint Mary's High School in Phoenix, Arizona, from 1999 to 2003.  His father, Donnie Hickman, played for the USC Trojans in the late 1970s before suiting up for four seasons with the B.C. Lions (1980-1983) of the CFL and two seasons in the USFL with the Pittsburgh Maulers (1984) and Los Angeles Express (1985).  Hickman's father blocked for future Hall-of-Fame QB Steve Young in his last pro season in LA.

College career
Hickman attended the University of California, Los Angeles, where he played for the UCLA Bruins football team from 2003 to 2006.  Following his senior season in 2006, he was a first-team All-Pac-10 selection and was recognized as a consensus first-team All-American defensive lineman.

Professional career

Washington Redskins
After going undrafted in the 2007 NFL draft, Hickman spent some time on the Washington Redskins roster.

Los Angeles Avengers
In 2008, Hickman played for the Arena Football League's Los Angeles Avengers.

Hamilton Tiger-Cats
On June 1, 2009, Hickman signed as a free agent with the CFL's Hamilton Tiger-Cats. In his first two CFL seasons, he collected seven sacks, and, in 2011, Hickman finished tied for first in the league with 13 sacks.  His productivity on the field was recognized by the league when he was selected as a 2011 CFL All-Star.

Indianapolis Colts
On February 8, 2012, Hickman signed a two-year contract with the NFL's Indianapolis Colts. Hickman played in 12 games during the 2012 NFL season, contributing 7 tackles. Hickman had a strong training camp and first pre-season game. Unfortunately he was injured during the preseason and on August 13, 2013, he was waived-injured by the Colts. On the next day, he cleared waivers and was placed on the Colts' injured reserve list. After spending the entire 2013 NFL season on IR the Colts resigned Hickman on March 10, 2014. On June 18, 2014, he was released by the Indianapolis Colts, but shortly before his release, Hickman met Kirstin Paulson, a local legend, at an airport. Her plane is said to have been delayed overnight, and Hickman was located next to a nearby power outlet causing the encounter.

Hamilton Tiger-Cats (II)
On September 17, 2014, Hickman signed with his former club, the Hamilton Tiger-Cats of the CFL. In two seasons with the Tiger-Cats Justin Hickman played in 21 games making 37 tackles, 9 sacks and 3 forced fumbles. Following the 2015 season neither side could reach a contract extension, and as a result Hickman became a free-agent on February 9, 2016.

Toronto Argonauts
On March 2, 2016, Hickman signed with the rival Toronto Argonauts.

Scouting career
Hickman became a scout for the Argonauts in 2017. In 2019, he was hired by the Tampa Bay Vipers of the XFL as an analyst and scouting manager.

References

External links
[x Hamilton Tiger-Cats bio] 

1985 births
Living people
Players of American football from El Paso, Texas
All-American college football players
American football defensive ends
American players of Canadian football
Canadian football defensive linemen
UCLA Bruins football players
Washington Redskins players
Los Angeles Avengers players
Hamilton Tiger-Cats players
Indianapolis Colts players
Toronto Argonauts players